Amanda Pelkey (born May 29, 1993) is an American ice hockey forward,  playing in the Premier Hockey Federation (PHF) with the Metropolitan Riveters. She won the Isobel Cup in 2016 with the Boston Pride and was previously affiliated with the Calgary section of the Professional Women's Hockey Players Association (PWHPA). Her college ice hockey career was played with the Vermont Catamounts women's ice hockey program in the Hockey East conference of the NCAA Division I.

Playing career

Early career
As a teenager, Amanda Pelkey played for North American Hockey Academy (NAHA) White, based in Stowe, Vermont, part of the Junior Women's Hockey League. She played in the 2010-2011 season for NAHA White, and was selected for the JWHL All-Star Game during the 2011 JWHL Challenge Cup.

University of Vermont Catamounts
Pelkey entered the 2011–12 NCAA season as a freshman, playing all 32 games of the season. Her sophomore year, the 2012–13 season, she tied for second on the team in points with twenty (nine goals, eleven assists) even though she missed the first month of the season with an injury (a broken collarbone sustained at the U.S. National Team Evaluation Camp during the summer).

Pelkey's junior year, 2013–14, was her best yet. She set single-season program records in goals (21) and points (40); she tied the program record for points in a single game with four in an October 2013 game against RIT; and she tied the single-season record with seven power play goals.

Pelkey started to become a leader on her team during her junior year, and her senior year, she was named co-captain of the Catamounts. Pelkey finished her college career as Vermont's all-time leader in goals (49), assists (56), and points (105).

NWHL
On June 22, 2015, Pelkey became the first player ever to sign with the Boston Pride, signing prior to the 2015-16 inaugural NWHL season. The Boston Pride won the Isobel Cup in their inaugural season, with Pelkey contributing ten points in 16 regular season games.

Pelkey was selected to participate in the 1st NWHL All-Star Game, which took place on January 24, 2016 at Harbor Center in Buffalo, New York.

International play
In January 2011, Pelkey played for Team USA in the IIHF Women's World U18 Championships, winning a gold medal. She'd also won a gold in the tournament with Team USA in 2009 at age 16. She tied for first in scoring in the 2011 tournament, with ten points (four goals and six assists) in five games. She followed that up with a silver medal with Team USA in 2012.
Pelkey also played in two IIHF World Women's Championships, winning gold with Team USA in 2016 and 2017, and was named to Team USA's 2018 Winter Olympics roster where she helped them win gold.

Career statistics

Regular season and playoffs

References

External links
 
 
 

1993 births
Living people
American women's ice hockey forwards
Boston Pride players
Ice hockey people from Vermont
Ice hockey players at the 2018 Winter Olympics
Isobel Cup champions
Medalists at the 2018 Winter Olympics
Metropolitan Riveters players
Olympic gold medalists for the United States in ice hockey
Professional Women's Hockey Players Association players
People from Montpelier, Vermont
Vermont Catamounts women's ice hockey players